Charles Griffiths may refer to:

 Charles Griffiths (British Army officer) (1763–1829), British soldier
 Charles Griffiths (footballer), British football manager
 Charles Griffiths (politician) (1903–1982), Australian politician

See also
Charles Griffith (disambiguation)